The Tony Award for Best Orchestrations is awarded to acknowledge the contributions of musical orchestrators in both musicals and plays. The award has been given since 1997.

Winners and nominees

1990s

2000s

2010s

2020s

Award records

Multiple wins
3 Wins
 Doug Besterman
 Alex Lacamoire
2 Wins
 Ralph Burns
 Stephen Oremus
 Don Sebesky
 Michael Starobin

Multiple nominations

11 Nominations
 Jonathan Tunick

9 Nominations
 Larry Hochman

7 Nominations
 Harold Wheeler

5 Nominations
 Doug Besterman

4 Nominations
 Bill Brohn
 Don Sebesky
 Danny Troob

3 Nominations
 Larry Blank
 John Clancy
 Bruce Coughlin
 Bill Elliott
 Tom Kitt
 Alex Lacamoire
 Michael Starobin

2 Nominations
 Ralph Burns
 Jason Carr
 David Cullen
 Simon Hale
 Michael Gibson
 Martin Koch
 Stephen Oremus
 Charlie Rosen
 Daryl Waters

External links
Tony Awards Official site
Tony Awards at Internet Broadway database Listing
Tony Awards at broadwayworld.com

 
Tony Awards
Awards established in 1997
1997 establishments in the United States